Trójca may refer to the following places in Poland:
Trójca, Lower Silesian Voivodeship (south-west Poland)
Trójca, Subcarpathian Voivodeship (south-east Poland)